Microlophium is a genus of true bugs belonging to the family Aphididae.

The species of this genus are found in Europe and Northern America.

Species:
 Microlophium carnosum (Buckton, 1876) 
 Microlophium primulae (Theobald, 1913)

References

Aphididae